Skørping railway station is a Danish railway station serving the railway town of Skørping in Himmerland south of Aalborg, Denmark.

The station is located on the Randers-Aalborg Line from Randers to Aalborg and is the southern terminus of the Aalborg Commuter Rail service. It opened in 1869. The train services are currently operated by the railway companies DSB and Nordjyske Jernbaner.

History 

The station opened in 1869 with the opening of the Randers-Aalborg railway line from Randers to Aalborg. It survived a series of station closures in the 1970s. In 2003 it became the southern terminus of the new Aalborg Commuter Rail service. In 2017, operation of the commuter rail services between Aalborg and Skørping were transferred from DSB to the local railway company Nordjyske Jernbaner.

Operations 
The train services are operated by the railway companies DSB and Nordjyske Jernbaner. The station offers direct InterCity services to Copenhagen and Aalborg, regional train services to Aarhus and Aalborg as well as commuter train services to Aalborg.

Architecture 
The original station building from 1869 was designed by the Danish architect N.P.C. Holsøe. It was rebuilt in 1878 and 1898. The station building was listed in 1992 along with the station's water tower.

In literature
Danish writer Herman Bang's novel Ved Vejen was inspired by an incident in 1883 when he was passing through Skørping Station. He noticed a young woman at the window who, her pale face couched in her hands, stared after his departing train. In the introduction to Stille Eksistenser he explains: "For the rest of the journey, I could see the woman's face between the flowers. Her look was not quite one of longing — longing would have perhaps fluttered to death by breaking its wings in such tight confines — just a quite resignation, a waning sorrow. And when the train had slid by, she would be peering out with the same look over Egnens Lyng — over the dreary plain."

Bang started writing the novel in 1885 in Vienna, after remembering Skørping Station: "It was in one of those windows behind the flowers that I saw her face, a face which I had not been able to erase from my memory for two years and which, as if a painter, I felt like drawing in soft, melancholic, almost blurry lines and using it as a kind of cover illustration for this book."

See also
 List of railway stations in Denmark

References

Bibliography

External links

 Banedanmark – government agency responsible for maintenance and traffic control of most of the Danish railway network
 DSB – largest Danish train operating company
 Nordjyske Jernbaner – Danish railway company operating in North Jutland Region
 Danske Jernbaner – website with information on railway history in Denmark
 Nordjyllands Jernbaner – website with information on railway history in North Jutland

Railway stations in the North Jutland Region
Railway stations opened in 1869
Listed railway stations in Denmark
Railway stations in Denmark opened in the 19th century